Ilija Čarapić, was the first Mayor of Belgrade, Serbia. He was born in 1792 in Beli Potok, near Avala, and died in 1844. He was son of the Voyvode Vasa Čarapić and the brother-in-law of Karađorđe, appointed as Voyvode or Duke of Grocka when he was only 18 years old after his uncle, Voyvode Tanasije Čarapić, who died in Prahovo, near Negotin.

Vojvoda Ilija Čarapić, with his wife Stamenka Karađorđević had no children. Ilija was the stepfather of Stamenka's daughter Jelena Ristić, who married Đorđe Radojlović, the founder of the Radojlović family.

See also
 Mayor of Belgrade
 List of Serbian Revolutionaries

References

1792 births
1844 deaths
19th-century Serbian people
People of the First Serbian Uprising
Mayors of Belgrade